Charles Egerton may refer to:

Charles Egerton (Indian Army officer) (1848–1921), senior British army officer
Charles Egerton (MP for Ripon), 17th-century English politician
Charles Egerton (MP for Brackley) (1645–1717)
Charles Egerton (MP for Wycombe) (1694–1725), MP for Wycombe
Charles Chandler Egerton (1798–1885), English surgeon
Charles Egerton (racehorse trainer), in 2009 Grand National

See also
Charles Egerton Osgood
Egerton (surname)